"I'm My Own Grandpa" (sometimes rendered as "I'm My Own Grandpaw") is a novelty song written by Dwight Latham and Moe Jaffe, performed by Lonzo and Oscar in 1947, about a man who, through an unlikely (but legal) combination of marriages, becomes stepfather to his own stepmother—that is, tacitly dropping the "step-" modifiers, he becomes his own grandfather.

In the 1930s, Latham had a group, the Jesters, on network radio; their specialties were bits of spoken humor and novelty songs. While reading a book of Mark Twain anecdotes, he once found a paragraph in which Twain proved it would be possible for a man to become his own grandfather. ("Very Closely Related" appears on page 87 of Wit and Humor of the Age, which was co-authored by Mark Twain in 1883.) In 1947, Latham and Jaffe expanded the idea into a song, which became a hit for Lonzo and Oscar.

Genealogy

In the song, the narrator marries a widow with an adult daughter. Subsequently, his father marries the widow's daughter. This creates a comic tangle of relationships by a mixture of blood and marriage; for example, the narrator's father is now also his stepson-in-law. The situation is complicated further when both couples have children.

Although the song continues to mention that both the narrator's wife and stepdaughter had children by the narrator and his father, respectively, the narrator actually becomes "his own grandpa" once his father marries the woman's daughter:
The narrator marries the older woman.
This results in the woman's daughter becoming his stepdaughter.
Subsequently, the narrator's father marries the older woman's daughter.
The woman's daughter, being the new wife of the narrator's father, is now both his stepdaughter and his stepmother. Concurrently, the narrator's father, being his stepdaughter's husband, is also his own stepson-in-law.
The narrator's wife, being the mother of his stepmother, is both the narrator's spouse and his step-grandmother.
The husband of the narrator's wife would then be the narrator's step-grandfather. Since the narrator is that person, he has managed to become his own (step-step)grandfather. The "step-step" concept applies because the step-father of one's step-mother would be one's step-step-grandfather, making a "double step" event possible.

The song continues with
The narrator and his wife having a son.
The narrator's son is the half-brother of his stepdaughter, as the narrator's wife is the mother of both.
Since his stepdaughter is also his stepmother, then the narrator's son is also his own (step-half-)uncle because he is the (half-)brother of his (step-)mother.
The narrator's son is therefore a (half-)brother-in-law to the narrator's father, because the son is the (half-)brother of the father's wife.
The narrator's father and his wife (the narrator's stepdaughter) then had a son of their own.
The child is the narrator's (step-) grandson because he is the son of his (step-)daughter.
The son is the (half-)brother of the narrator because they share a father.

Real-life incidents
According to a 2007 article, the song was inspired by an anecdote that has been published periodically by newspapers for well over 150 years. The earliest citation was from the Republican Chronicle of Ithaca, New York on  April 24, 1822, and that was copied from the London Literary Gazette:

A proof that a man may be his own Grandfather.—There was a widow and her daughter-in-law, and a man and his son. The widow married the son, and the daughter the old man; the widow was, therefore, mother to her husband's father, consequently grandmother to her own husband. They had a son, to whom she was great-grandmother; now, as the son of a great-grandmother must be either a grandfather or great-uncle, this boy was therefore his own grandfather. N. B. This was actually the case with a boy at a school in Norwich.

An 1884 book, The World of Wonders, attributed the original "remarkable genealogical curiosity" to Hood's Magazine.

In 1989, The Rolling Stones bassist Bill Wyman married Mandy Smith; she was 18 and he 52. In 1993, Wyman's 30-year-old son from his first marriage, Stephen, married Smith's mother, Patsy, who was then aged 46. Had Bill and Mandy not divorced by then, Stephen would have been his own step-step-grandfather.

Cover versions
The cover version by Lonzo and Oscar was recorded in 1947, the same year that Latham and Jaffe released The Jesters original.  A version by Guy Lombardo and The Guy Lombardo Trio became a hit in 1948. The song was also recorded by Phil Harris (as "He's His Own Grandpa"), Jo Stafford (as "I'm My Own Grandmaw"), singer/bandleader Tony Pastor, Kimball Coburn, Homer and Jethro, and "Jon & Alun" (Jon Mark and Alun Davies) on their record "Relax Your Mind" (1963).

A 1976 episode of The Muppet Show includes a skit in which the song is performed by the all-Muppet Gogolala Jubilee Jugband. Ray Stevens recorded a version for his 1987 album Crackin' Up. In the movie The Stupids, Stanley Stupid, portrayed by Tom Arnold, sings "I'm My Own Grandpa" while on a talk show about strange families.  Willie Nelson performed the song on his 2001 album The Rainbow Connection. This song was also performed by Grandpa Jones, who sang it both at the Grand Ole Opry and on the TV show Hee Haw. It was also later recorded on the album Home is Where the Heart Is by David Grisman and on Michael Cooney's album of songs for children. Folk singer Steve Goodman included it in his live shows, and recorded it on his album "Somebody Else's Troubles". This song has also been recorded by an Australian Comedy Country Artist Chad Morgan and appears on an album "Sheilas, Drongos, Dills and Other Geezers" and also Australian Country Artist, Melinda Schneider with the Schneider Sisters.  It has also been covered by the Asylum Street Spankers and released on the 2002 Bloodshot Records compilation "The Bottle Let Me Down."
Larry Wilder of Portland, OR, performs the tune in his "Songs From the Heart of the People" show.
The humorous folk singer, Anthony John Clarke, frequently covers it in his gigs and has recorded it on his 2004 album Just Bring Yourself.  The song also frequently appears as a Barbershop Quartet arrangement in video-file-sharing websites such as YouTube. The Bar-J Wranglers of Jackson, Wyoming frequently perform the song in their live chuckwagon dinner show, and their studio recording was included on the 1998 album "Headin' for the Home Corral."

Logic and reasoning

Professor Philip Johnson-Laird used the song to illustrate issues in formal logic as contrasted with psychology of reasoning, noting that the transitive property of identity relationships expressed in natural language was highly sensitive to variations in grammar, while reasoning by models, such as the one constructed in the song, avoided this sensitivity.

The situation is included in a set of problems attributed to Alcuin of York, and also in the final story in Baital Pachisi; the question asks to describe the relationship of the children to each other. Alcuin's solution is that the children are simultaneously uncle and nephew to each other; he does not draw attention to the relationships of the other characters.

In the Baital Pachisi this is the only riddle that the wise King Vikrama cannot answer.

References

External links
DeadDisc list of cover versions
 I'm My Own Grandpaw Lyrics with Java illustration
 Public domain recording by the Jesters at Internet Archive.

1947 songs
American songs
Guy Lombardo songs
The Muppets songs
Novelty songs
Songs about old age
Songs written by Moe Jaffe
Stepfamily